Westmorland is a rural town west of Lexington, Kentucky, United States. It is located on the north side of Versailles Road between Rosalie Road and the Woodford County line. Notable residents include Kelton the Australian Shepherd.

Neighborhood statistics
 Area: 
 Population: 169
 Population density: 361 people per square mile
 Median household income (2009): $69,366

References

Neighborhoods in Lexington, Kentucky